Kaan: Barbarian's Blade is a third-person action video game developed by Eko Software SARL and published by DreamCatcher Interactive. The game was released for Microsoft Windows in 2002 and then ported to PlayStation 2 in 2004.

The game is available as a download via GamersGate and DotEmu.

The game has 17 levels, where a young barbarian warrior Kaan must recover the orb of Hope from Tothum Siptet, a sorcerer with evil powers.

External links
Kaan: Barbarian's Blade at Microïds

2002 video games
DreamCatcher Interactive games
Eko Software games
Europe-exclusive video games
Microïds games
PlayStation 2 games
Single-player video games
Video games developed in France
Windows games